Paornivik Island is an uninhabited island in Avannaata municipality in northwestern Greenland.

Geography 
The horseshoe-shaped Paornivik Island is located in Tasiusaq Bay, in the north-central part of Upernavik Archipelago. It is sandwiched between Qullikorsuit Island in the north − from which it is separated by the narrow Paorniviup Tunua strait − and Mernoq Island in the southwest. To the east, inner waterways of Tasiusaq Bay separate it from an unnamed nunatak on the mainland of Greenland.

See also
List of islands of Greenland

References 

Uninhabited islands of Greenland
Tasiusaq Bay
Islands of the Upernavik Archipelago